The family Agaonidae is a group of pollinating and nonpollinating fig wasps. They spend their larval stage inside the fruits of figs. The pollinating wasps (Agaoninae, Kradibiinae, and Tetrapusiinae) are the mutualistic partners of the fig trees. The non-pollinating fig wasps are parasitoids. Extinct forms from the Eocene and Miocene are nearly identical to modern forms, suggesting that the niche has been stable over geologic time.

Taxonomy
The family has changed several times since its taxonomic appearance after the work of Francis Walker in 1846 described from the wasp genus Agaon. 
Previously the subfamilies Epichrysomallinae, Otitesellinae, Sycoecinae, Sycoryctinae, Sycophaginae, and Agaoninae were the subdivisions of the family. Recent works building strong molecular phylogenies with an extended sampling size have changed the composition of Agaonidae. First, the paraphyletic groups have been excluded (Epichrysomallinae, Otitesellinae, Sycoecinae, and Sycoryctinae) and new subfamilies have been instated (Kradibiinae and Tetrapusiinae). Then the subfamily Sycophaginae have been placed within the family Agaonidae.
Within the Sycophaginae, some changes were made after the molecular phylogeny of the subfamily: the genus Apocryptophagus has been synonymed under the genus Sycophaga.

Ecology
Wasps from the three subfamilies Agaoninae, Kradibiinae and Tetrapusiinae are pollinating fig wasps. On the other hand, Sycophaginae are parasites of the Ficus, developing in the fruits after other wasps have pollinated them. Nevertheless, some species in the genus Sycophaga have a controversial status; as they enter the fig by its ostiole, they possibly bring pollen inside the fig and might pollinate it.

Morphological adaptations
The pollinating female fig wasps are winged and in general dark, while the males are mostly wingless and whitish. This difference of color is probably due to a clear split in the gender role. Once they have mated, male and female fig wasps have different fates. In some fig species, such as Ficus subpisocarpa or Ficus tinctoria, the males have to chew a hole for the females to leave their natal fig. The winged female wasps can fly over long distances before finding another fig to oviposit in it, while the male dies after chewing a hole.
As the fig is closed by a tight ostiole, the female wasps have developed adaptations to enter. First, the mandibles of the female wasps have developed specialized mandibular appendages to help them crawl into the figs. These appendages are adapted to the host fig species, with for instance spiraled ostioles matched by spiral mandibular appendages.
The nonpollinating wasps also have developed impressive morphological adaptations to deposit eggs inside the fig from the outside, in the form of an extremely long ovipositor.

Subfamilies and genera

Agaoninae
 Agaon Dalman, 1818
 Alfonsiella Waterston, 1920
 Allotriozoon Grandi, 1916
 Blastophaga Gravenhorst, 1829
 Blastophaga psenes Linnaeus (syn. Cynips psenes Linnaeus, 1758)
 Courtella Kieffer, 1911
 Deilagaon Wiebes, 1977
 Dolichoris Hill, 1967
 Elisabethiella Grandi, 1928
 Eupristina Saunders, 1882
 Eupristina verticillata Waterston, 1921
 Nigeriella Wiebes 1974
 Paragaon Joseph, 1959
 Pegoscapus Cameron, 1906 
 Platyscapa Motschoulsky, 1863
 Pleistodontes Saunders, 1882
 Waterstoniella
 Wiebesia Boucek, 1988

Kradibiinae
 Ceratosolen Mayr, 1885
 Kradibia Saunders, 1883 (syn. Liporrhopalum Waterston, 1920)

Sycophaginae
 Anidarnes
 Eukoebelea
 Idarnes
 Pseudidarnes
 Sycophaga

Tetrapusiinae
 Tetrapus

Extinct genera 
 †Archaeagaon Insect Limestone, United Kingdom, Eocene (Priabonian)
 †Archaeagaon minutum (Donisthorpe)

References 

 
Apocrita families
Insects described in 1848